G Elias & Brother was and American manufacturer of cabinets and aircraft based in Buffalo, New York in the 1920s.  A.G. Elias sat on the Manufacturers Aircraft Association's board of directors along with President Frank H. Russell, VP Glenn L. Martin, Charles L. Laurence, Chance M. Vought, S.S. Bradley, George P. Tidmarsh, and Donald Douglas.  E.J Elias promoted the construction of a Buffalo municipal airport to aid the local fledgling airplane industry of five aviation companies constructing airplanes and airplane parts.  From 1920 to 1925, Elias company's chief engineer, David Earle Dunlap (1896-1957), designed the Elias EM-2 Expeditionary planes. He designed the NBS-3 bomber fuselage and the Elias M-1 Mail plane.  Dunlap's Elias TA-1 design was the first United States Army Air Corps Trainer to have a radial engine.  After tests a McCook Field, the Army Air Corps selected other manufacturers over the Elias bomber and trainer.  The company designed the Elias EM-1 to meet requirements for a multirole amphibian marine expeditionary aircraft.  Elias delivered six production Elias EM-2 aircraft with Liberty engines to the United States Navy in 1922.

Aircraft

*Elias Airmobile

*Elias EC-1 Aircoupe
The EC-1 Aircoupe was a parasol wing monoplane powered by an  Anzani engine which first flew in 1928.
  Designed by Joseph Cato, it had an open cockpit with a removable cabin enclosure. The airplane was known as the Airsport when flown without the cabin enclosure. The EC-1 was also available with a  Kinner K-5 engine. One prototype is known, but more may have been produced.

*Elias EM
The Elias EM-1 was designed to meet a United States Marine Corps requirement for a multirole marine expeditionary aircraft. It was required to operate on either floats or wheels. The EM-1 was a tandem two-seat unequal-span biplane powered by a 300 hp (224 kW) Wright-Hispano H engine. The prototype was modified with equal-span wings and delivered to the Marine Corps in 1922. Six production aircraft were built (designated EM-2) having equal-span wings, being powered by 400 hp (298 kW) Liberty 12 inline engines. One production aircraft was delivered to the United States Marine Corps and five to the United States Navy. One of the Navy aircraft was modified as an observation aircraft and redesignated EO-1. Variants include:
 EM-1:  Prototype with a 300 hp (224 kW) Wright-Hispano H engine, one built.
 EM-2:  Production aircraft with a 400 hp (298 kW) Liberty 12 inline engine, six built including one later converted to an EO-1.
 EO-1:  One EM-2 aircraft converted as an observation aircraft.

*Elias XNBS-3
The Elias XNBS-3 was a 1920s prototype biplane bomber built for the United States Army Air Corps.
 The bomber had a steel tube fuselage and was powered by two  Liberty 12A piston engines. It had a conventional landing gear with a tailskid and a crew of four. The prototype was designated XNBS-3 (XNBS=prototype night bomber short distance).  On 13 August 1924 Lieutenant John A. Macready test piloted the Elias XNBS-3 twin engine bomber for the United States Army Air Corps at McCook Field in Dayton, Ohio.  The XNBS-3 had New York to Chicago non-stop range and five machine guns for defense. It was similar to the earlier Martin NBS-1 and was no real improvement, so it was not ordered into production.

*Elias TA-1
The Elias TA-1 was a 1920s American biplane training aircraft. Only three aircraft were built for evaluation by the United States Army Air Service. The TA-1 (a United States military designation Trainer, Aircooled No. 1) was designed to meet a United States Army requirement for a training aircraft for the air service. The TA-1 was a conventional two-seat biplane. Three were built, two with a Lawrance R-1 engine and another with an ABC Wasp, the last two under McCook field project numbers Elias P-178 and Elias P-179. The aircraft performance was inferior to the other aircraft under evaluation (the Dayton-Wright TA-3) and no orders were placed or further aircraft built.

Gallery

See also
 Martin NBS-1
 List of military aircraft of the United States
 List of bomber aircraft

References

Bibliography

 

 John Andrade, U.S.Military Aircraft Designations and Serials since 1909, Midland Counties Publications, 1979,  (Page 171)
 The Illustrated Encyclopedia of Aircraft (Part Work 1982–1985), 1985, Orbis Publishing

External links
  G. Elias Brothers M-1 mail plane at the Buffalo Airport.

1920s United States military trainer aircraft
TA-1
Floatplanes
1920s United States attack aircraft
EM
Single-engined tractor aircraft
1920s United States bomber aircraft
NBS-3
Biplanes
Twin piston-engined tractor aircraft
1920s United States civil utility aircraft
EC-1
Parasol-wing aircraft
Aircraft first flown in 1928
Aerospace companies of the United States
Defunct aircraft manufacturers of the United States